The European University of Bangladesh or EUB is a private university located at Dhaka, Bangladesh. The university was established in 2012 under the Private University Act, 1992. Eng. Md. Alim Dad is vice-chancellor of the university. The university was founded by Muhiuddin Khan Alamgir, former Home Minister and Bangladesh Awami League politician.

History 
European University of Bangladesh (EUB) is a private university aiming at providing modern education of European standards in Bangladesh. It has been accredited by the Government of the People's Republic of Bangladesh, curricula and academic while its programs have been approved by the University Grants Commission (UGC). It was established under the Private University Act 2010 with the approval of the Government of Bangladesh on 14 March 2012 for awarding degrees in various fields. The President of the People's Republic of Bangladesh is the chancellor and Eng. Md. Alim Dad is the vice-chancellor of European University of Bangladesh. They also have an established cultural theater. which is called by EUB Theater. They are organizing and participating in stage drama at Shilpakala Academy. and also making video fiction too.

Academic

Faculties and departments
 (1) Faculty of Science & Engineering
 (1)  Department of Civil engineering (CE)
 (2)  Department of Electrical and electronic engineering (EEE)
 (3)  Department of Computer science and engineering (CSE)
 (4)  Department of Industrial and production engineering (IPE)
 (5)  Department of Textile Engineering (TE)
 (2) Faculty of Business Administration & Industrial Management
 (1)  Bachelor of Business Administration (BBA)
 (2)  Master of Business Administration (MBA) (Regular)
 (3)  Master of Business Administration (MBA) (Executive)
 (4)  Bachelor of Tourism and Hospitality Management (BTHM)
 (3) Faculty of Arts and Social Science
 (1)  BSS (Hon's) in Economics
 (2)  MSS in Economics
 (3)  Bachelor of Arts in English (Hon's)
 (4)  MA in English (Preli & Final)
 (5)  MSS in Governance and Development Studies
 (6)  Bachelor of Laws (2Yrs LLB)
 (7)  Bachelor of Laws (4Yrs LLB)
 (8)  Master of Laws (1 & 2 Yrs LLM)

References

 

Universities and colleges in Dhaka
Private universities in Bangladesh
Educational institutions established in 2012
2012 establishments in Bangladesh